The Sure Thing is a 1985 American adventure comedy romance film written by Steven L. Bloom and Jonathan Roberts and directed by Rob Reiner. The film stars John Cusack, Daphne Zuniga, Viveca Lindfors, and Nicollette Sheridan. The film chronicles the cross-country journey of college students Walter Gibson (Cusack) and Alison Bradbury (Zuniga) as they make their way from New England to Los Angeles, each in an effort to meet their ideal match.

The origins of the film came from an experience writer Steven L. Bloom had while attending Brown University. During this time, his best friend was attending Emory University in Atlanta, GA and was constantly recounting the good times he was having while absolutely nothing was going on for Bloom. Out of pity over his situation his friend arranged for him to meet a sure thing over spring break, so Bloom found a ride through a ride board and drove to Atlanta with a number of other students.

Plot
High school senior Walter Gibson and his best friend Lance are celebrating the fact they are moving on to college, but all Walter can do is lament the fact that he has lost his touch with women. Lance heads to UCLA while Walter moves on to college in New England. The two keep in touch by writing letters, but Walter's luck has not changed. His attempt to get close to Alison Bradbury from his English class by tricking her into tutoring him only results in his angering and alienating her. Eventually, he receives a phone call from Lance telling him to come to California for Christmas break because he has set him up with a beautiful girl, assuring him she is a "sure thing."

Walter finds a ride from a ride-share board to make the trip. He meets Gary Cooper and Mary Ann Webster, the couple providing the ride. Things go from bad to worse when he realizes he will be sitting next to Alison as she heads to UCLA to visit her boyfriend Jason. The tension and bickering between Walter and Alison becomes too much for Cooper, and he abandons them on the side of the road in the middle of nowhere and Alison hitches a ride which turns out to be a big mistake. The driver stops at a deserted little pocket of the road and attempts to rape her, but Walter comes to her rescue just in the nick of time. As they hitch to California, they overcome issues with transportation, weather, lack of food, lack of money, and sleeping arrangements, while at the same time developing genuine feelings for one another. En route to California, Alison discovers the real reason Walter made the trip is to meet his "sure thing" and angrily walks away after they arrive.

That night at a college mixer Lance has arranged for Walter to meet his "sure thing". Meanwhile, Alison is spending a boring night with Jason when she drags him to the same mixer for some fun. Alison and Walter see each other at the party, but jealousy leads to a confrontation between the two. Walter takes the "sure thing" to Lance's room, but cannot stop thinking about Alison.

Back on campus after the break, Alison and Walter are obviously uncomfortable around each other. In their English class, Professor Taub reads an essay composed by Walter as a writing assignment, which is a description of his night with the "sure thing". The girl in the essay asks the protagonist if he loves her, but for the first time he realizes that those are not just words and he cannot sleep with her. Alison realizes what actually happened that night, she tells Walter that she and Jason broke up, and they kiss.

Cast

 John Cusack as Walter "Gib" Gibson
 Daphne Zuniga as Alison Bradbury
 Nicollette Sheridan as "The Sure Thing"
 Viveca Lindfors as Professor Taub
 Anthony Edwards as Lance
 Tim Robbins as Gary Cooper
 Boyd Gaines as Jason
 Lisa Jane Persky as Mary Ann Webster
 Fran Ryan as Lady in Car
 Larry Hankin as Trucker
 Sarah Buxton as Sharon
 Robert Bauer as Moke

Casting
When casting for the part of Walter Gibson began, director Rob Reiner initially refused to meet with John Cusack because the actor was under-aged. Casting directors Jane Jenkins and Janet Hirshenson convinced Reiner  to audition Cusack, after which Reiner knew he had to have him for the part. At the time Anthony Edwards was seriously being considered for the lead, but after Cusack got the part, Edwards was offered the best friend role instead.

At the time of his casting, Cusack was still 16 and had not yet graduated from high school, so producer Roger Birnbaum had to go to court to have him emancipated. During the filming of the movie (March–April 1984), Birnbaum then became Cusack's legal guardian.

Robert Bauer played the same character, Moke, in two Rob Reiner movies, This Is Spinal Tap (1984) and this one.

Soundtrack
Many popular songs were used in the film but a soundtrack was never officially released.  The following is a list of tracks featured in the film:

Release

Box office
The film earned over $18 million at the box office.

Reception
Reviews for The Sure Thing were mostly positive. Film critic Roger Ebert, who gave it three-and-a-half stars out of four, praised the film and called it a "small miracle" for its handling of teenage material in an era when movies like Porky's were the norm. In a review for The New York Times, Janet Maslin wrote that The Sure Thing was "glowing proof of two things: Traditional romantic comedy can be adapted to suit the teen-age trade, and Mr. Reiner's contribution to This Is Spinal Tap was more than a matter of humor". The website's critical consensus reads: "Though its final outcome is predictable, The Sure Thing is a charming, smartly written, and mature teen comedy featuring a breakout role for John Cusack."

References

External links

 
 
 
 
 The Sure Thing at The 80s Movies Rewind

1985 films
American romantic comedy films
1985 romantic comedy films
1980s English-language films
American comedy road movies
1980s comedy road movies
Films shot in California
American teen comedy films
Films directed by Rob Reiner
Films produced by Roger Birnbaum
Films scored by Tom Scott
1980s Christmas comedy films
Embassy Pictures films
1980s teen comedy films
American Christmas comedy films
Films with screenplays by Jonathan Roberts (writer)
1980s American films